Bahram Kushanshah (also spelled Varahran), was the last Kushanshah of the Kushano-Sasanian Kingdom from 330 to 365. He was the successor of Peroz II Kushanshah.

Name 
His theophoric name "Varahran" is the New Persian form of the Middle Persian Warahrān (also spelled Wahrām), which is derived from the Old Iranian Vṛθragna. The Avestan equivalent was Verethragna, the name of the old Iranian god of victory, whilst the Parthian version was *Warθagn. The name is transliterated in Greek as Baranes, whilst the Armenian transliteration is Vahagn/Vrām.

Reign
Unlike his immediate predecessors, Varahran's domains only included Tukharistan, as both Gandhara and Kabul had been incorporated into the Sasanian Empire by the Sasanian King of Kings Shapur II. Varahran did not issue coins in Gandhara, and his predecessor Peroz II is the last known Kushano-Sassanian ruler to do so. After that point Shapur II issued his own coinage from Kabul.

Varahran Kushanshah wears a distinctive crown on his coinage, which is flat-topped with a crown ball and florets, and pearls or lotus petals as a decoration on the sides. In the second phase of his reign, the coinage of Varahran minted in Balkh incorporated the Kidarite tamga replacing the nandipada which had been in use since Vasudeva I, suggesting that the Kidarites had now taken control, first under their ruler Kirada. Ram horns were added to the effigy of Varahran on his coinage for a brief period under the Kidarite ruler Peroz, and raised ribbons were added around the crown ball under the Kidarite ruler Kidara. In effect, Varahran has been described as a "puppet" of the Kidarites.

Traditionally, these variations in the coin types of Varahran, especially the modifications of the symbols and the figure of the ruler on the obverse while maintaining the regnal legend with the name "Varahran", were explained by supposing the existence of additional rulers named Varahran, such as a "Varahran II Kushanshah" or a "Varahran III Kushanshah". According to modern scholarship however, there was only one Varahran, whose coinage went under several phases under the authority of the Kidarite rulers Kirada, Peroz and Kidara.

By 365, the Kidarite ruler Kidara I was placing his name on the coinage of the region, and assumed the title of Kushanshah. In Gandhara too, the Kidarites minted silver coins in the name of Varahran, until Kidara also introduced his own name there.

References

Sources 
  
  
 
 
 
 
 
  
  
 
 

Kushanshahs
4th-century monarchs in Asia
4th-century Iranian people
Monarchs of the Kushano-Sasanian Kingdom